Patriarch Nicholas of Alexandria may refer to:

 Nicholas I of Constantinople, Ecumenical Patriarch in 901–907 and 912–925
 Nicholas II of Constantinople, Ecumenical Patriarch in 984–996
 Nicholas III of Constantinople, Ecumenical Patriarch in 1084–1111
 Nicholas IV of Constantinople, Ecumenical Patriarch in 1147–1151